Swept Away is a 2002 American adventure comedy romance film written and directed by Guy Ritchie; it is a remake of Lina Wertmüller's 1974 Italian film of the same name. The film stars Ritchie's then-wife Madonna and Adriano Giannini (the son of Giancarlo Giannini, the original film's lead) with a supporting cast featuring Bruce Greenwood, Jeanne Tripplehorn and Elizabeth Banks.

Produced by Matthew Vaughn and released theatrically by Screen Gems, Swept Away was a box office bomb, grossing less than a tenth of its $10 million budget worldwide, and was panned by critics, who have considered it to be one of the worst films ever made.

Plot summary
Amber Leighton is a wealthy, spoiled socialite wife of a millionaire who joins two other couples on a private cruise from Italy to Greece. Amber develops an instant and intense dislike for Giuseppe, a deckhand, and insults him mercilessly throughout the trip. During the trip, she insists on being taken out on a dinghy for a lark, overruling Giuseppe's warnings about an oncoming storm.

During their dinghy trip, Amber berates Giuseppe incessantly, which only intensifies once they run out of gas. Through a series of mishaps, Amber damages the dinghy and they end up washing ashore on a deserted island.

On the island, Giuseppe gains the upper hand in their interactions due to his survival skills. As the roles reverse, Giuseppe becomes more dominant in his treatment of Amber, while she concurrently becomes more submissive and cowering. Their relationship evolves into intimacy.

Eventually, the two are rescued and return to their normal lives. Giuseppe attempts to reach out to Amber, to rekindle their relationship, but his messages receive no reply. Giuseppe believes that Amber has rejected him, and is despondent. However, it is revealed at the end that his letters have been intercepted by Amber's wealthy husband, who ensures that Amber never sees them or Giuseppe again.

Cast
 Madonna as Amber Leighton
 Adriano Giannini as Giuseppe Esposito
 Bruce Greenwood as Tony Leighton
 Jeanne Tripplehorn as Marina
 Elizabeth Banks as Debi
 Michael Beattie as Todd
 David Thornton as Michael

Production
The film's working title was Love, Sex, Drugs and Money and was filmed in Sardinia and Malta from 1 October 2001 until 9 November 2001 with security increased due to the 9/11 terrorist attacks. Madonna had only finished her 2001 Drowned World Tour two weeks prior to filming. Giancarlo Giannini's role in the original film is played by his son Adriano Giannini.

Release

Critical reception
The film received extremely negative reviews from critics. On Rotten Tomatoes it has a 5% rating, based on 78 reviews, with an average rating of 2.8/10. The site's consensus states: "Muddled and lacking the political context of the original, Swept Away offers further proof that Madonna can't act." Metacritic reports an 18 out of 100 rating, based on 27 critics, indicating "overwhelming dislike".

Roger Ebert, of the Chicago Sun-Times, who called the original Swept Away such an "absorbing movie" that he bestowed with a 4-out-of-4 star rating, gave the remake only 1 star. According to Ebert, despite Ritchie's relatively faithful adaptation, the original Swept Away was "incomparably superior," and the remake's fatal flaw was the "utterly missing" vitality or emotional resonance of the main characters. Additionally, wrote Ebert, Madonna's character "starts out so hateful that she can never really turn it around" and gain any redemption or believable change. Similarly, A.O. Scott of The New York Times wrote, "In her concerts, music videos and recordings, Madonna has often been a mesmerizing performer, but she is still not much of an actress. Striking a pose is not the same as embodying a person, and a role like this one requires the surrender of emotional control, something Madonna seems constitutionally unable to achieve." In his otherwise negative review of the film, Slant Magazine critic Ed Gonzalez said: "Madonna gives her best performance since Abel Ferrara had her beaten to a pulp in his Dangerous Game."

"The way critics take it out on me now is to have a go at anything me and Guy do together," Madonna remarked about the negative critical reaction. "Everyone in England has slagged it off without having seen it. Isn't that beautiful? Don't you think that's absurd? But I think the knives were going to come out for Guy anyway, even if he hadn't ended up with me. He had too much success with his first two films. That's how the media is: eventually they have to pull you down."

Box office
Swept Away was a box office bomb; from a $10 million budget, it grossed $598,645 in the United States and around $437,875 from foreign territories for a worldwide total of $1,036,520. It was shown only on 196 screens for two weeks, dropping down to 59 in the final third week of release. In Italy, it grossed €71,575 and in Spain €105,371 from 174 screens.

Accolades
The film was awarded five awards at the 2002 Golden Raspberry Awards. Additionally, Madonna won Worst Supporting Actress that same year (for Die Another Day).
 Worst Picture
 Worst Actress – Madonna
 Worst Screen Couple – Madonna and Giannini
 Worst Remake or Sequel
 Worst Director – Guy Ritchie

The film was nominated for Worst Screenplay (written by Ritchie), and Giannini for Worst Actor. It was the first to win both Worst Picture and Worst Remake or Sequel.

At the 2002 Stinkers Bad Movie Awards, the film won three awards:
 Worst Picture
 Worst Actress – Madonna
 Worst On-Screen Couple – Madonna and Giannini

The film also received nominations for Worst Director (Ritchie), Most Intrusive Musical Score, and Worst Remake.

Soundtrack

The score was composed by Michel Colombier, and it is mostly his work that is featured on the 12-track soundtrack album. The soundtrack also contains several songs by other artists. "Come-On-a-My-House", sung by Della Reese, is the only one featured on the album.

Songs not featured on the album include "Lovely Head" by Goldfrapp (played during the opening credits), "Ain't Nobody Here but Us Chickens" by Louis Jordan (the charades scene), and "Fade into You" by Mazzy Star (as Amber and Pepe experience life on the island together). Arvo Pärt's "Spiegel im Spiegel" plays during the closing moments and end credits of the film.

Home media
In the United Kingdom, the film was released direct-to-video by Columbia TriStar Home Entertainment. The DVD special features include a filmmakers' commentary with Ritchie and Vaughn, an interview with Ritchie and Madonna, sixteen deleted scenes, Movie Special (making of), theatrical trailers, and filmographies.
In 2019 Swept Away was reissued on DVD and released on Blu-Ray by Fabulous Films, under license from Sony Pictures.

See also
 List of films considered the worst
 Survival Island

References

External links
 
 
 
 

2002 films
English-language Italian films
2000s English-language films
Greek-language films
2000s Italian-language films
2002 comedy-drama films
2002 romantic comedy-drama films
American romantic comedy-drama films
British comedy-drama films
British romantic comedy-drama films
Italian romantic comedy-drama films
American remakes of Italian films
Films about communism
Films directed by Guy Ritchie
Films set in Greece
Films set in Italy
Films set in the Mediterranean Sea
Films set on uninhabited islands
Films shot in Italy
Films shot in Malta
Films shot in Sardinia
Screen Gems films
SKA Films films
Impact of the September 11 attacks on cinema
Films scored by Michel Colombier
Films produced by Matthew Vaughn
Films with screenplays by Guy Ritchie
Films about castaways
Golden Raspberry Award winning films
2000s American films
2000s British films